Type 12 may refer to:
Type 12 frigate, a ship class of three ship classes of the Royal Navy
Belgian State Railways Type 12, a class of 2-4-2 steam locomotives built 1888–1897
Datsun Type 12, a car produced by the Nissan corporation
Porsche Type 12, a German automobile project produced in 1931
NMBS/SNCB Type 12, a class of 4-4-2 steam locomotives built in 1938–1939
Type 12 Surface-to-Ship Missile, Japanese surface-to-ship missile
Type 12 torpedo, Japanese anti-submarine torpedo